Parqu Quta (Aymara parqu twisted, quta lake, "twisted lake", also spelled Parco Kkota) is a mountain in the Cordillera Real in the Andes of Bolivia which reaches a height of approxilamtely . It is located in the La Paz Department, Murillo Province, Palca Municipality. Parqu Quta lies at a small lake, west of Mururata.

References 

Mountains of La Paz Department (Bolivia)